Montpelier Wildlife Management Area at  is an Idaho wildlife management area in Bear Lake County east of the town of Montpelier. The WMA consists of land owned by the Idaho Department of Fish and Game (IDFG) and Bureau of Land Management and Idaho Department of Lands property managed by IDFG. 

The WMA is managed for big game, including mule deer, pronghorn, and elk. In addition to hunting, there is a diversity of birds for bird watching in the WMA.

References

Protected areas established in 1971
Protected areas of Blaine County, Idaho
Wildlife management areas of Idaho